Backseat Boys leads here. For the professional wrestling tag team that consisted of Johnny Kashmere and Trent Acid, see The Backseat Boyz

Backseat, originally named Backseat Boys, is a Danish pop rock band that was established Ivan Pedersen, an already well-known Grammy winning pop artist in 1992 with original members Søren Jacobsen (guitars), Helge Solberg (bass), Esben Just (piano/organ) and Carsten Millner, (drums) with the debut release Wind Me Up. They were signed to Kick Music label. Soon after guitarist Lars Krarup joined in 1994 and a second release followed called Long Distance. In 1995, the band's name was changed from Backseat Boys to just Backseat.

In 1995 three of the five members (Søren Jacobsen, Esben Just and Carsten Millner) left and two new members joined in namely Otto Sidenius (organ) and Claes Antonsen (drums). Backseat also changed labels signing in 1996 with CMC Records. More changes came to lineup as Claus Antonsen, Thomas Helmig and Otto Sidenius stopped and were replaced by Lars "Mitch" Fischermann (drums) and Olle Nyberg on keyboards.

In 1998, the band released a compilation of favourite covers under the title Shut Up and Play with covers including amongst other, songs from Bob Seger, John Haitt, Sheryl Crow, Jimi Hendrix etc. The band broke up in 1999 to be reformed seven years later in 2006 touring Denmark and releasing the album Globalization in 2007.

The band has had a big comeback in 2013 with a major release on Target Distribution titled Sesoned & Served that entered Hitlisten the official Danish Albums Chart at #8 in its first week of release.

Members
Backseat Boys 1992-1995
Ivan Pedersen - vocals 
Søren Jacobsen - guitar
Helge Solberg - bass
Esben Just - piano/organ
Carsten Millner - drums
Lars Krarup (from 1994) - guitar

Backsteat 1995-1996
Ivan Pedersen - vocals
Helge Solberg - bass
Lars Krarup - guitar
Otto Sidenius (organ)
Claus Antonsen (drums)

Backsteat 1996-1999
Ivan Pedersen - vocals
Helge Solberg - bass
Lars Krarup - guitar
Lars "Mitch" Fischermann - drums
Olle Nyberg - keyboards.

Backseat 2007–present
Ivan Pedersen - vocals
Søren Jacobsen - guitar
Henrik Askou - drums
Helge Solberg - bass
Martin Jønsson - keyboards

Discography

Albums

References

External links
Official website

Danish pop music groups